Beaver Glacier may refer to:
Beaver Glacier (Enderby Land)
Beaver Glacier (Ross Ice Shelf)